Avenida station is part of the Blue Line of the Lisbon Metro.

History
Avenida is one of the 11 stations that belong to the original Lisbon Metro network, opened on December 29, 1959. This station is located on Avenida da Liberdade, from which it takes its name. The architectural design of the original station is by Falcão e Cunha.

On November 9, 1982, the station was extended, based on the architectural design of Sanchez Jorge. On June 8, 2009, the station was refurbished, based on the architectural design of Ana Nascimento

Connections

Urban buses

Carris 
 202 Cais do Sodré ⇄ Fetais (morning service)
 709 Campo de Ourique ⇄ Restauradores
 711 Terreiro do Paço ⇄ Alto da Damaia
 732 Marquês de Pombal ⇄ Caselas
 736 Cais do Sodré ⇄ Odivelas (Bairro Dr. Lima Pimentel)

Aerobus 
 Linha 1 Aeroporto ⇄ Cais do Sodré

See also
 List of Lisbon metro stations

References

External links

Blue Line (Lisbon Metro) stations
Railway stations opened in 1959